The 2014 NCAA Division I baseball tournament began on Friday, May 30, 2014 as part of the 2014 NCAA Division I baseball season. The 64 team double elimination tournament concluded with the 2014 College World Series in Omaha, Nebraska, which started on June 14, 2014, and ended on June 25, 2014 with the Vanderbilt Commodores upsetting the 3rd seed Virginia Cavaliers 3–2 in the decisive Game 3.

The 64 participating NCAA Division I college baseball teams were selected out of an eligible 298 teams. A total of 31 teams were awarded an automatic bid as champions of their conferences, and 33 teams were selected at-large by the NCAA Division I Baseball Committee.

Teams were divided into 16 regionals of four teams which conducted a double-elimination tournament. Regional champions faced each other in Super Regionals, a best-of-3-game series that determined the 8 participants of the College World Series.

Bids

Automatic bids

By conference

National seeds
The following eight teams automatically host a Super Regional if they advance to that round:
Oregon State †
Florida †
Virginia
Indiana †
Florida State †
Louisiana–Lafayette ‡
TCU
 †

Bold indicates College World Series participant
† indicates teams that were eliminated in the Regional Tournament
‡ indicates teams that were eliminated in the Super Regional Tournament

Regionals and Super Regionals
Bold indicates winner.

Stillwater Super Regional

Austin Super Regional
Hosted by Texas at UFCU Disch–Falk Field

Louisville Super Regional

Nashville Super Regional

Lubbock Super Regional
Hosted by Texas Tech at Dan Law Field at Rip Griffin Park

Fort Worth Super Regional

Lafayette Super Regional

Charlottesville Super Regional

College World Series
The 2014 College World Series began on June 14, 2014 and was held at TD Ameritrade Park in Omaha, Nebraska. It concluded on June 25, 2014 with Vanderbilt winning the national championship by defeating Virginia 2 games to 1 in the final round.

Participants

Bracket
Seeds listed below indicate national seeds only.

Game results

Game began Friday night at 7:00 pm CT. A rain delay occurred at 7:32 pm. The game was suspended at 9:05 pm and resumed Saturday at 2:02 pm.

All-Tournament Team
The following players were members of the College World Series All-Tournament Team.

Final standings
Seeds listed below indicate national seeds only

Record by conference

The columns RF, SR, WS, NS, CS, and NC respectively stand for the Regional Finals, Super Regionals, College World Series, National Semifinals, Championship Series, and National Champion.

Media coverage

Radio
NRG Media, in conjunction with Westwood One/NCAA Radio Network provided nationwide radio coverage of the College World Series, which was streamed online at westwoodonesports.com. Kevin Kugler and John Bishop called all games leading up to the Championship Series with Gary Sharp acting as the field reporter. The Championship Series was called by Kugler and Scott Graham with Sharp acting as the field reporter.

Television
ESPN carried every game from the Regionals, Super Regionals, and College World Series across the ESPN Networks (ESPN, ESPN2, ESPNU, and ESPN3). ESPN also provided Bases Loaded coverage for the Regionals. Bases Loaded was hosted by Dari Nowkhah and Matt Schick with Kyle Peterson and Mike Rooney providing analysis. Bases Loaded aired Friday and Saturday from 2:00 pm–midnight ET, Sunday from 2:00 pm–1:00 am ET, and Monday from 6:00 pm–1:00 am ET on ESPN3. ESPN2 and ESPNU aired Bases Loaded in between games and throughout other select times during the tournament.

Broadcast assignments

Regionals
Adam Amin & Danny Kanell – Corvallis, Oregon
Mark Neely & Randy Flores – Stillwater, Oklahoma
Tom Hart & Ben McDonald – Houston, Texas
Brett Dolan & Nick Belmonte – Baton Rouge, Louisiana
Joe Davis & Greg Swindell – Tallahassee, Florida
Clay Matvick & Gabe Gross – Louisville, Kentucky
Dave Neal & Chris Burke – Nashville, Tennessee
Jim Barbar & John Gregory – Bloomington, Indiana
Super Regionals
Dave Neal, Kyle Peterson, Chris Burke, & Jaymee Sire – Nashville, Tennessee
Dari Nowkhah, Danny Kanell, & Kaylee Hartung – Austin, Texas
Carter Blackburn & Alex Cora – Louisville, Kentucky
Clay Matvick & Eduardo Perez – Stillwater, Oklahoma
College World Series
Jon Sciambi, Aaron Boone, & Jaymee Sire - Afternoons
Karl Ravech, Kyle Peterson, & Jessica Mendoza – Evenings

Regionals
Trey Bender & Rusty Ensor – Gainesville, Florida
Doug Sherman & Leland Maddox – Coral Gables, Florida
Roxy Bernstein & Wes Clements – San Luis Obispo, California
Wayne Hagan & Jerry Kendall – Ft. Worth, Texas
Kevin Dunn & Keith Moreland – Lafayette, Louisiana
Mike Morgan & Dave Perno – Oxford, Mississippi
Dave Weekley & Chip Fridrich – Columbia, South Carolina
Paul Loeffler & Jay Walker – Charlottesville, Virginia
Super Regionals
Mike Patrick & Doug Glanville – Charlottesville, Virginia
Joe Davis & Jay Walker – Lubbock, Texas
Adam Amin & Keith Moreland – Ft. Worth, Texas
Tom Hart & Ben McDonald – Lafayette, Louisiana
College World Series Championship Series
Karl Ravech, Kyle Peterson, Aaron Boone, Jessica Mendoza, & Jaymee Sire

References

NCAA Division I Baseball Championship
Tournament
College World Series
Baseball in Austin, Texas
Baseball in Houston
Baseball in Lubbock, Texas
Baseball in the Dallas–Fort Worth metroplex
Events in Lubbock, Texas
Sports competitions in Texas